Mister Heartbreak is the second studio album by avant-garde artist, singer and composer Laurie Anderson, released on February 14, 1984.

Like its predecessor, it contains reworked elements of Anderson's United States ("Langue d'Amour", "Kokuku", based on musical elements from "Rising Sun", and "Blue Lagoon"). However, Anderson also introduced new material ("Sharkey's Day"/"Sharkey's Night" and "Gravity's Angel"), while "Excellent Birds", written in collaboration with Peter Gabriel, was written for a 1984 project for video artist Nam June Paik called Good Morning, Mr. Orwell.

Background
"Gravity's Angel" borrows imagery from Thomas Pynchon's Gravity's Rainbow. Anderson had "wanted to make an opera of that book ... and asked him if that would be OK... He said, 'You can do it, but you can only use banjo.' And so I thought, 'Well, thanks. I don't know if I could do it like that." "Blue Lagoon" contains allusions to other tales of the sea: William Shakespeare's The Tempest (Ariel's song) and Herman Melville's Moby-Dick.

The album's lead track, "Sharkey's Day", formed the basis of a popular music video. Author William S. Burroughs read the lyrics of the closing track, "Sharkey's Night", while Peter Gabriel provided vocals on "Excellent Birds", an alternate version of which, titled "This is the Picture (Excellent Birds)", also appeared on his album So (1986). According to Anderson, she and Gabriel "could never agree on what a bassline was. (I think I probably don't hear so well down there.) I wanted to learn from him, but it turned into a standoff and so we each put out our own version of the song." A third version of the song can be heard in the music video version, directed by Dean Winkler. 

Most of the songs on the album were later performed in Anderson's 1986 concert film Home of the Brave. Burroughs appears in the film in two brief segments, reciting lines from "Sharkey's Night", although it is Anderson herself who performs a complete version of the song at the film's conclusion. "Sharkey's Night" featured in the Australian short documentary film Ladies Please! (1995).

Track listing
All songs written by Laurie Anderson, except where otherwise indicated.

Side one
"Sharkey's Day" – 7:41
"Langue d'Amour" – 6:12
"Gravity's Angel" – 6:02

Side two
"Kokoku" – 7:03
"Excellent Birds" (Anderson, Peter Gabriel) – 3:12
"Blue Lagoon" – 7:03
"Sharkey's Night" (Anderson, William S. Burroughs) – 2:29

Personnel

Laurie Anderson – vocals (tracks 1–6), Synclavier (track 1–6), violin (track 1), whistle (track 1), electronic conches (track 2), vocoder (track 2), bell (track 3), percussion (track 4)
Adrian Belew – guitar (tracks 1, 3, 6, 7)
Anton Fier – drums (track 1), toms (track 4), wood block (track 4)
Bill Laswell – bass guitar (tracks 1, 3–6)
Daniel Ponce – iya (tracks 1), ikonkolo (track 1), shekere (track 1), double bell from the Cameroons (track 1)
November (Michelle Cobbs, Dolette McDonald, Brenda Nelson) – back-up vocals (track 1)
Peter Gabriel – back-up vocals (tracks 2–3), vocals (track 5), Synclavier (track 5), LinnDrum (track 5)
David Van Tieghem – plywood (track 3), bowls (track 3), Simmons drums (track 3), drums (track 3), steel drum (track 6), gato (track 6), bamboo (track 6)
Sang-Won Park – kayagum (track 4)
Phoebe Snow – back-up vocals (track 4)
Atsuko Yuma – back-up vocals (track 4)
Connie Harvey – Japanese chorus (track 4)
Janet Wright – Japanese chorus (track 4)
Nile Rodgers – guitar (track 5)
Bill Blaber – soprano (track 6)
William S. Burroughs – vocals (track 7)

Technical
Laurie Anderson – co-producer (tracks 1–2, 4–7), producer (track 3), art, graphics
Bill Laswell – co-producer (tracks 1, 4, 7), mixing assistance (track 3)
Roma Baron – co-producer (tracks 2, 6)
Peter Gabriel – co-producer (track 5)
Leanne Ungar – engineer
Bob Bielecki – technical consultant, systems design, Synclavier spectral displays
Mike Getlin – assistant engineer
Joe Lopes – assistant engineer
Pat Martin – assistant engineer
Larry Franke – assistant engineer
Tim Cox – assistant engineer
Mike Krowiak – mixing assistant
Bob Ludwig – mastering
Howie Weinberg – mastering
Bud Shark – printing

Charts
Album

References

External links

 Mister Heartbreak at Myspace (streamed copy where licensed)

Laurie Anderson albums
1984 albums
Albums produced by Bill Laswell
Warner Records albums
William S. Burroughs
Art pop albums
Experimental music albums